Michael Dineen (17 April 1881 – 23 February 1933) was a British athlete. He competed in the men's triple jump at the 1908 Summer Olympics.

References

1881 births
1933 deaths
Athletes (track and field) at the 1908 Summer Olympics
British male triple jumpers
Olympic athletes of Great Britain
Place of birth missing